Unforgettable – A Musical Tribute to Nat King Cole is a soundtrack album released in the UK in 1983 by the CBS Records division of Columbia in conjunction with the broadcast of American pop singer Johnny Mathis's BBC television concert special of the same name that featured Cole's daughter Natalie. The front of the original album jacket credits the concert performers as "Johnny Mathis and Natalie Cole", whereas the CD booklet reads, "Johnny Mathis with special guest Natalie Cole".

The LP entered the UK album chart on September 17, 1983, and reached number five over the course of 16 weeks, and the following month, on October 31, the British Phonographic Industry awarded the album with Gold certification for sales of 100,000 units in the UK.

In the liner notes on the original album sleeve Natalie Cole writes, "It was an honor to work with an artist of the stature of Johnny Mathis, one of the few artists in the world whom I feel can do justice to my father's music."

Track listing
From the liner notes for the original album:

 "Unforgettable" (instrumental)/"Sweet Lorraine" (Irving Gordon/Cliff Burwell, Mitchell Parish) – 3:12
 Ronnie Hazlehurst – arranger 
 "Nature Boy" (Eden Ahbez) – 3:27
Neil Richardson – arranger 
 "Orange Colored Sky" (Milton DeLugg, Willie Stein) – 2:11
 Allyn Ferguson – arranger 
 "Too Young" (Sylvia Dee, Sidney Lippman) – 3:19
 D'Arneill Pershing – arranger 
 Medley – 5:50  a. "Route 66" (Bobby Troup)  b. "(I Love You) For Sentimental Reasons" (Deek Watson, William Best)  c. "Red Sails in the Sunset" (Hugh Williams, Jimmy Kennedy)  d. "Walkin' My Baby Back Home" (Fred E. Ahlert, Roy Turk)  e. "It's Only a Paper Moon" (Harold Arlen, E. Y. Harburg, Billy Rose)
 Ronnie Hazlehurst – arranger 
 "Stardust" (Hoagy Carmichael, Mitchell Parish) – 3:24
 Brian Rogers – arranger (original arrangement by Gordon Jenkins) 
 "Unforgettable" (instrumental) (Irving Gordon) – 0:12
 Ronnie Hazlehurst – arranger 
 Medley  (solo performance by Natalie Cole)  – 6:20  a. "Straighten Up and Fly Right" (Nat King Cole, Irving Mills)  b. "Mona Lisa" (Ray Evans, Jay Livingston)  c. "L-O-V-E" (Milt Gabler, Bert Kaempfert)  d. "Dance, Ballerina, Dance" a.k.a. "Ballerina" (Bob Russell, Carl Sigman)  e. "Ramblin' Rose" (Joe Sherman, Noel Sherman)  f. "The Christmas Song" (Bob Wells, Mel Torme)
 Joe Guercio – arranger 
 "To the Ends of the Earth" (Joe Sherman, Noel Sherman) – 3:27
 D'Arneill Pershing – arranger 
 "That Sunday, That Summer" (Joe Sherman, George David Weiss) – 3:22
 Ronnie Hazlehurst – arranger (original arrangement by Ralph Carmichael) 
 Medley (performed with Natalie Cole)  – 5:42  a. "Let There Be Love" (Ian Grant, Lionel Rand)  b. "When I Fall in Love" (Edward Heyman, Victor Young) 
Neil Richardson – arranger (original arrangement of "Let There Be Love" by Ralph Carmichael and George Shearing) 
 "Unforgettable" (Irving Gordon) – 4:05
 Allyn Ferguson – arranger

Song information

Over half of the songs selected for the concert were chart hits in Billboard
magazine that Cole originated, several of which were recorded with the King Cole Trio. "Straighten Up and Fly Right" peaked at number nine on the magazine's Best Sellers in Stores chart and enjoyed 10 weeks at number one on its Harlem Hit Parade and six weeks at number one on the magazine's list of the Most Played Juke Box Folk Records in 1944. "Route 66" peaked at number 11 on its Most Played by Jockeys list and number three on the Most Played Juke Box Race Records chart in 1946. "(I Love You) For Sentimental Reasons" started a six-week stay at number one on the Most Played by Jockeys chart and reached number three on the list of the Most Played Juke Box Race Records later that year. Both of those charts recorded a number three showing by "The Christmas Song" upon its first release during the 1946 holiday season; the perennial favorite became the singer's first Gold record for its sale of one million copies.

Cole's next two Gold records, 1948's "Nature Boy" and 1950's "Mona Lisa", spent eight weeks at number one on Billboards Most Played by Jockeys list with the former making it to number two on the Most Played Juke Box Race Records chart and the latter racking up four weeks at number one on that same chart, which had since been renamed Most Played Juke Box Rhythm & Blues Records. Stan Kenton & His Orchestra provided accompaniment on another of Cole's hits from 1950, "Orange Colored Sky", which had its best showing at number five on the Most Played by Jockeys chart. Another Gold record that Mathis covers here is 1951's "Too Young", which got as high as number three on the Juke Box Rhythm & Blues chart and was at number one for five weeks on the list of Best Sellers in Stores.

The original recording of this album's title track was a number 12 hit for Cole on Billboard'''s Most Played by Jockeys list in 1952. "To the Ends of the Earth" reached number 25 on that same chart as well as the list of Best Sellers in Stores in 1956. 1963's "That Sunday, That Summer" had its biggest chart success as a number three Easy Listening hit and also peaked at number 12 pop and number 19 R&B. And "L-O-V-E" was also more successful on the Easy Listening chart, where it reached number 17 in 1964, compared to its peak position at number 81 pop.

Many other songs that Mathis and Natalie Cole performed here had been established as hits by other people, and her father went on to have success with them as well. Bing Crosby was the first artist to have a vocal version of "Stardust" make the charts when he took the song to number five in 1931. In 1957 Cole's recording reached number 24 on the UK singles chart and number 79 on the Billboard Hot 100. "Walkin' My Baby Back Home" first charted as a number eight hit for Nick Lucas in 1931, and Cole peaked in that same position on Billboards Most Played by Jockeys list with the song in 1952. Peggy Healy provided vocal accompaniment for Paul Whiteman & His Orchestra on their number nine hit from 1933, "It's Only a Paper Moon", and although Cole never charted with the song,
he recorded it on December 15, 1943, with the King Cole Trio and on August 15, 1956, for his album with his trio After Midnight. Those same two sessions each included recordings of another song that Cole never put on the charts, "Sweet Lorraine", which was a number 17 instrumental hit from 1935 for Teddy Wilson & His Orchestra.

The rendition of "Red Sails in the Sunset" by Guy Lombardo & His Royal Canadians with Carmen Lombardo on vocal was the first to make the Billboard'' charts when it spent four weeks at number one there in 1935; Cole's 1951 version reached number 24 on the magazine's list of Best Sellers in Stores. Sammy Kaye & His Orchestra's recording of "Let There Be Love" with Tommy Ryan on vocal got as high as number four in 1940, and Cole took the song to number 11 in the UK in 1962. "Ballerina" was a Gold record for Vaughn Monroe that spent 10 weeks at number one that began in 1947; the 1957 cover reached number 18 on the Most Played by Jockeys chart. Perry Como was the first to have a hit with "Ramblin' Rose" when he peaked at number 18 with the song in 1948, but Cole's 1962 recording made it to number two pop and number seven R&B in addition to spending five weeks at number one Easy Listening; it was the last of his original recordings to go Gold. And "When I Fall in Love" was a number 20 hit for Doris Day in 1952, but the release of Cole's rendition in the UK in 1957 gave him a number two hit on the singles chart.

Personnel
From the liner notes for the original album:

 Performers

Johnny Mathis – vocals
Natalie Cole – vocals ("The Christmas Song", "Dance, Ballerina, Dance", "Let There Be Love", " L-O-V-E", "Mona Lisa", "Ramblin' Rose", "Straighten Up and Fly Right", "When I Fall in Love")
Levine Andrade – strings
Michael Bach – bass
Kenny Baker – trumpet
Norris Bosworth – strings
Robin Firman – strings
John Franca – strings
Hans Geiger – strings
Bill Geldard – brass
John Graham – strings
Chris Green – strings
John Huckridge – brass
Maurice Isaacs – strings
Homi Kanga – strings
Gary Kettel – percussion
Bobby Lamb – trombone
Laurie Lewis – strings
Joe Lizama – drums
Eddie Mordue – saxophone
Thelma Owen – harp
Bill Reid – strings
Cyril Reuben – brass
George Robertson – strings
Gil Rogers – guitar
Jack Rothstein – strings (leader)
Celia Sheen – strings
Bill Skeat – brass
Wally Smith – brass
Hubert Staar – brass
Larry Steelman – keyboards
Derek Watkins – trumpet
John Willison – strings
Peter Willison – strings
Roy Willox – brass
Manny Winter – brass

 Production
Jim Ganduglia – musical director
Yvonne Littlewood – television producer
Len Shorey – television sound supervisor
Hugh Attwooll – mixer
Mike Ross – mixer
Rob O'Connor (Stylo Rouge) – sleeve design
Viv Mabon – illustration
David Vance – photographer
Mixed at CBS Studios, London

References

Bibliography

 

1983 live albums
Johnny Mathis live albums
Natalie Cole albums
Albums arranged by Allyn Ferguson
Columbia Records live albums
Nat King Cole tribute albums
Vocal duet albums